The Saratoga Cup was an American Thoroughbred horse race open to horses of either sex age three and older although geldings were not eligible from 1865 through 1918. Between 1865 and 1955 it was hosted by Saratoga Race Course, in Saratoga Springs, New York with the exception of 1943 through 1945 when wartime restrictions were in place and the race was held at Belmont Park in Elmont, New York.

The race was not run from 1887 to 1890, from 1892 to 1900, in 1908, 1911, 1912, from 1956 to 1962, and from 1964 to 1993. The 75 editions of the race were contested at four different distances:
 1865–1886 : 2¼ miles
 1891 : 2 miles
 1901: 1 miles
 1902–1955 : 1¾ miles

"The seventy-sixth running Saratoga Cup"
In 1963, track owner/operator New York Racing Association held a one-time only commemorative event they called "The seventy-sixth running Saratoga Cup 'The Centennial Season Running.'" It was run at a distance of 1 5/8 miles and was won by Fitz Eugene Dixon, Jr.'s three-year-old gelding, Will I Rule.

Historical notes
During his Hall of Fame career James E. "Sunny Jim" Fitzsimmons won numerous top races more than five times each including the Belmont Stakes. With ten wins, the Saratoga Cup was most and the race was also among his most memorable as the 1914 edition marked his first important major race win as a trainer.

Exterminator, the 1918 Kentucky Derby winner and a U. S. Racing Hall of Fame inductee, won this race four years in row from 1919 to 1922. In his 1920 win, Exterminator set a world record of 2:56 4/5 for 1¾  miles on dirt. Exterminator's owner Willis Sharpe Kilmer was a notoriously difficult employer and for each of the four wins, Exterminator had a different jockey and a different trainer.

In 1875 a very rare event in horse racing occurred when Preakness and Springbok together set a new American record for the 2 1/4 mile distance in winning the Saratoga Cup in a dead heat.

There were three walkovers in the 75-year history of the Saratoga Cup. Long-distance races were declining in popularity and by the 1920s the number of entrants was regularly only four or five horses. As such, the first walkover came in 1921 when Exterminator's dominance in racing scared away the competition. The second occurred in 1940 and was unique in that it involved two horses, Isolater and Fenelon. Both horses were owned by the powerful Belair Sud Stable who declared Isolater to win. The third time there was a walkover happened in 1946 with Ethel Jacob's Stymie. The future U. S. Racing Hall of Fame inductee had won the 1945 edition of the Saratoga Cup with ease in a year when it was held at Belmont Park. Stymie's continued dominance in racing saw his competition avoiding him in the race's return to Saratoga in 1946.

The 1911–1912 statewide shutdown of horse racing
On June 11, 1908, the Republican controlled New York Legislature under Governor Charles Evans Hughes passed the Hart–Agnew anti-betting legislation. The owners of Saratoga Race Course, and other racing facilities in New York State, struggled to stay in business without income from betting. In spite of strong opposition by prominent owners such as August Belmont Jr. and Harry Payne Whitney, reform legislators were not happy when they learned that betting was still going on at racetracks between individuals and they had further restrictive legislation passed by the New York Legislature in 1910. The Agnew–Perkins Law, a series of four bills and recorded as the Executive Liability Act, made it possible for racetrack owners and members of its board of directors to be fined and imprisoned if anyone was found betting, even privately, anywhere on their premises.  After a 1911 amendment to the law that would limit the liability of owners and directors was defeated in the Legislature, every racetrack in New York State shut down. As a result, the Saratoga Cup was not run in 1911 and 1912.

A February 21, 1913 ruling by the New York Supreme Court, Appellate Division saw horse racing return in 1913. However, it was too late for some racing facilities and financial difficulties meant that Brighton Beach Race Course, Gravesend Race Track and Sheepshead Bay Race Track never reopened.

Records
Speed record:
 1 ¾ miles – 2:55 flat : Reigh Count (1928)
 2 ¼ miles – 3:56 ¼ : Preakness & Springbok (1875) Dead heat

Most wins:
 Exterminator (1919, 1920, 1921, 1922)

Most wins by a jockey:
 3 – James Butwell (1909, 1915, 1917)
 3 – James Stout (1936, 1939, 1940)

Most wins by a trainer:
 10 – James E. Fitzsimmons (1914, 1929, 1930, 1934, 1936, 1939, 1940, 1951, 1952, 1954)

Most wins by an owner:
 4 – David McDaniel (1872, 1873, 1874, 1875)
 4 – Willis Sharpe Kilmer (1919, 1920, 1921, 1922)

Winners

References

Open long distance horse races
Discontinued horse races in New York (state)
Saratoga Race Course
Recurring sporting events established in 1865
Recurring sporting events disestablished in 1955
1865 establishments in New York (state)
1955 disestablishments in New York (state)